Italy competed at the 1964 Summer Olympics in Tokyo, Japan. 168 competitors, 157 men and 11 women, took part in 91 events in 18 sports.

Medalists

Gold
 Abdon Pamich — Athletics, Men's 50 km Walk 
 Fernando Atzori — Boxing, Men's Flyweight
 Cosimo Pinto — Boxing, Men's Light Heavyweight
 Giovanni Pettenella — Cycling, Men's 1000m Sprint (Scratch) 
 Mario Zanin — Cycling, Men's Individual Road Race 
 Sergio Bianchetto and Angelo Damiano — Cycling, Men's 2000m Tandem 
 Mauro Checcoli — Equestrian, Three-Day Event Individual 
 Paolo Angioni, Mauro Checcoli, and Giuseppe Ravano — Equestrian, Three-Day Event Team
 Franco Menichelli — Gymnastics, Men's Floor Exercises 
 Ennio Mattarelli — Shooting, Men's Trap Shooting

Silver
 Sergio Bianchetto — Cycling, Men's 1000m Sprint (Scratch) 
 Giovanni Pettenella — Cycling, Men's 1000m Time Trial 
 Giorgio Ursi — Cycling, Men's 4000m Individual Pursuit 
 Cencio Mantovani, Carlo Rancati, Luigi Roncaglia, and Franco Testa — Cycling, Men's 4000m Team Pursuit 
 Severino Andreoli, Luciano Dalla Bona, Pietro Guerra, and Ferruccio Manza — Cycling, Men's Team Road Race 
 Klaus Dibiasi — Diving, Men's Platform 
 Giovan Battista Breda, Giuseppe Delfino, Gianfranco Paolucci, Alberto Pellegrino, and Gianluigi Saccaro — Fencing, Men's Épée Team 
 Giampaolo Calanchini, Wladimiro Calarese, Pier-Luigi Chicca, Mario Ravagnan, and Cesare Salvadori — Fencing, Men's Sabre Team
 Franco Menichelli — Gymnastics, Men's Rings
 Renato Bosatta, Franco De Pedrina, Giuseppe Galante, Giovanni Spinola, and Emilio Trivini — Rowing, Men's Coxed Fours

Bronze
 Salvatore Morale — Athletics, Men's 400m Hurdles
 Silvano Bertini — Boxing, Men's Welterweight
 Franco Valle — Boxing, Men's Middleweight
 Giuseppe Ros — Boxing, Men's Heavyweight
 Piero D'Inzeo, Raimondo D'Inzeo, and Graziano Mancinelli — Equestrian, Jumping Team 
 Antonella Ragno-Lonzi — Fencing, Women's Foil Individual 
 Franco Menichelli — Gymnastics, Men's Parallel Bars

Athletics

Results

Basketball

Men's Team Competition
Team Roster
Gianfranco Bertini
Sauro Bufalini
Ottorino Flaborea
Giovanni Gavagnin
Augusto Giomo
Gianfranco Lombardi
Massimo Masini
Giusto Pellanera
Gianfranco Pieri
Gianfranco Sardagna
Gabriele Vianello
Paolo Vittori

Boxing

Canoeing

Cycling

14 cyclists represented Italy in 1964.

 Individual road race
 Mario Zanin
 Severino Andreoli
 Felice Gimondi
 Ferruccio Manza

 Team time trial
 Severino Andreoli
 Luciano Dalla Bona
 Pietro Guerra
 Ferruccio Manza

 Sprint
 Giovanni Pettenella
 Sergio Bianchetto

 1000m time trial
 Giovanni Pettenella

 Tandem
 Angelo Damiano
 Sergio Bianchetto

 Individual pursuit
 Giorgio Ursi

 Team pursuit
 Luigi Roncaglia
 Cencio Mantovani
 Carlo Rancati
 Franco Testa

Diving

Equestrian

Fencing

20 fencers, 15 men and 5 women, represented Italy in 1964.

Men's foil
 Mario Curletto
 Nicola Granieri
 Pasquale La Ragione

Men's team foil
 Gianguido Milanesi, Pasquale La Ragione, Arcangelo Pinelli, Nicola Granieri, Mario Curletto

Men's épée
 Gianluigi Saccaro
 Alberto Pellegrino
 Giuseppe Delfino

Men's team épée
 Giuseppe Delfino, Alberto Pellegrino, Gianluigi Saccaro, Gianfranco Paolucci, Giovanni Battista Breda

Men's sabre
 Pierluigi Chicca
 Cesare Salvadori
 Wladimiro Calarese

Men's team sabre
 Wladimiro Calarese, Giampaolo Calanchini, Pierluigi Chicca, Mario Ravagnan, Cesare Salvadori

Women's foil
 Antonella Ragno-Lonzi
 Giovanna Masciotta
 Bruna Colombetti-Peroncini

Women's team foil
 Antonella Ragno-Lonzi, Giovanna Masciotta, Irene Camber-Corno, Natalina Sanguinetti, Bruna Colombetti-Peroncini

Gymnastics

Judo

Modern pentathlon

One male pentathlete represented Italy in 1964.

Individual
 Alfonso Ottaviani

Rowing

Sailing

Shooting

Five shooters represented Italy in 1964. Ennio Mattarelli won the gold medal in the trap event.

25 m pistol
 Giovanni Liverzani
 Ugo Amicosante

50 m pistol
 Ugo Simoni

Trap
 Ennio Mattarelli
 Galliano Rossini

Swimming

Men's 4 × 200 m Freestyle Relay
Sergio De Gregorio, Bruno Bianchi, Giovanni Orlando, and Pietro Boscaini
 Final — 8:18.1 (→ 8th place)

Men's 4 × 100 m Medley Relay
Chiaffredo Rora, Gian Corrado Gross, Giampiero Fossati, and Pietro Boscaini
 Final — 4:10.3 (→ 7th place)

Water polo

Men's Team Competition
Team Roster
Danio Bardi
Mario Cevasco
Giuseppe d'Altrui
Federico Dennerlein
Giancarlo Guerrini
Franco Lavoratori
Gianni Lonzi
Eugenio Merello
Rosario Parmegiani
Eraldo Pizzo
Dante Rossi
Alberto Spinola

Weightlifting

Wrestling

References

External links
 

Nations at the 1964 Summer Olympics
1964
1964 in Italian sport